Évaux-les-Bains is a commune in the Creuse department in the Nouvelle-Aquitaine region in central France.

History
A spa town founded by the Romans in the first century, who developed thermal baths and called the place “Ivaonum,” possibly after a deity, Ivaos. It became a place of pilgrimage after the sixth century, because of the tomb of the Christian hermit Marien.

A monastery was built here in the tenth century, but this was destroyed in the seventeenth century. It was the regional capital of the Combraille in the thirteenth century and was besieged during the Hundred Years War by the Routiers.

The Roman baths, abandoned since the fifth century, became popular again at the beginning of the 17th century and again in the nineteenth century.

Geography
The commune is on the border with the department of Allier and is served by a TER railway link to Montluçon.

Population

Sights
 The church of St. Peter & Paul, dating from the eleventh century.
 The seventeenth century châteaux of Relibert and Monterolle.
 The church of Notre-Dame.
 Remains of an old convent.
 The chapel of Saint Marien.
 Vestiges of the town gates and walls.
 Châteaux de Relibert, Monterolle.
 Vestiges of the Roman baths.
 The Tardes viaduct, by  Gustave Eiffel.
 The war memorial.
 The eleventh-century chapel of Saint Radegonde.

See also
Communes of the Creuse department

References

External links

Official commune website 
Tourist Office website 

Communes of Creuse
County of La Marche